Newton County Courthouse may refer to:

 Newton County Courthouse (Arkansas), Jasper, Arkansas
 Newton County Courthouse (Georgia), Covington, Georgia
 Newton County Courthouse (Indiana), Kentland, Indiana
 Newton County Courthouse (Texas), Newton, Texas, listed on the National Register of Historic Places